Southside with You is a 2016 American biographical romantic drama film written, produced, and directed by Richard Tanne, in his feature film directorial debut. The film stars Parker Sawyers and Tika Sumpter as a young Barack Obama (the future 44th president of the United States), and Michelle Robinson, respectively, and focuses on the couple's first date in 1989.

The film premiered at the 2016 Sundance Film Festival, where it garnered critical acclaim. It was released theatrically in the United States on August 26, 2016, by Miramax and Roadside Attractions, and grossed over $6.5 million worldwide.

Plot 
Harvard Law School student Barack Obama, while working as a summer associate at a Chicago law firm in 1989, arranges to meet Michelle Robinson, a young lawyer and his supervisor at the firm ostensibly to go to a community organizing meeting. However when they meet in the morning, he tells her that the meeting is at 4pm and he wants to fill the time till then getting to know each other. She is initially apprehensive because they work together, but agrees.

They visit an African art exhibition at a local art center which features an Ernie Barnes exhibit, and share stories about growing up while walking through a park. At the community organizing meeting, Obama gives a rousing speech which is well-received by the audience including Robinson. In the evening, they view a screening of Spike Lee's Do the Right Thing, and have their first kiss outside an ice cream parlor in what winds up being their first date.

Cast 

 Parker Sawyers as Barack Obama
 Tika Sumpter as Michelle Robinson
 Vanessa Bell Calloway as Marian Robinson
 Phillip Edward Van Lear as Fraser C. Robinson
 Deanna Reed-Foster as Bernadette
 Jerod Haynes as Tommy
 Gabrielle Lott-Rogers as Rafiqa 
 Tom McEloryn as Avery Goodman
 Taylar Fondren as Janice
 Donn Carl Harper as Curtis
 Preston Tate, Jr. as Kyle

Production 
The original idea was developed by Richard Tanne in 2007, after which he started writing the script. On December 5, 2014, Deadline reported that there would be a romance film titled Southside with You, based on the first date of American President Barack Obama and his wife Michelle Obama, set in Chicago, where the couple met in 1989 and married in 1992. Tika Sumpter would play Michelle, while no one had yet been cast in Barack's role. Tanne would make his directing debut on the film, based on his own script, and producing alongside Tika Sumpter.

On April 10, 2015, IM Global came on board to produce the film with producer Robert Teitel. In April 2015, Sumpter talked with Vulture about her preparations to play Michelle, and stated that she was "nervous" because she was about to play "Michelle Obama, who is everything every woman wants to be," and also said that she was reading some poetry and books to get to know more about Michelle, so she could portray the role better. On May 7, 2015, Parker Sawyers was cast as the young Barack Obama. Producers on the film were Tanne and Sumpter, along with Teitel, through IM Global.

Filming 
Principal photography on the film began on July 13, 2015 on location in Chicago, Illinois; following that, several websites released photos from the set. Filming wrapped on July 31, 2015. Locations included downtown, the South Side, and the West Side. Filming was also done on Amstutz Expressway in Waukegan.

Release
The film had its world premiere at the Sundance Film Festival on January 24, 2016. Shortly after, Miramax and Roadside Attractions acquired theatrical distribution rights to the film. On April 28, 2016, Miramax released the first official trailer for the film. The film was distributed worldwide with theatrical releases in France, Germany, Singapore, UK, Ireland, Greece, Cyprus, Turkey, Spain, Italy, Hong Kong, and parts of the Middle East.

Box office
Southside with You was released in North America on August 26, 2016, and was initially projected to gross around $2 million from 813 theaters in its opening weekend. It ended up grossing $2.9 million, a per-theater average of $3,762. The film went on to gross a total of $6.5 million against its $1.5 million budget.

Home media 
Southside with You became available on Digital HD on November 29, 2016 and Blu-Ray and DVD on December 13, 2016 from Lionsgate and Miramax. The film became available to stream on Netflix on April 26, 2017. On November 10, 2018, the film had its cable television premiere on BET, airing back-to-back with BET Presents: Love and Happiness: An Obama Celebration, a televised 2016 White House concert that honored the Presidency of Barack Obama and the First Lady Michelle Obama.

Reception

Critical response
Southside with You received mostly positive reviews, with praise going to Tanne's direction and screenplay, as well as to the performances of Sumpter and Sawyers. Upon its premiere at Sundance, it immediately garnered positive buzz with Essence writing that "critics gave it two very enthusiastic thumbs up, calling it a classic romance story." On review aggregator Rotten Tomatoes, the film holds an approval rating of 91% based on 163 reviews, with an average rating of 7.30/10. The website's critical consensus states, "Southside with You looks back on a fateful real-life date with strong performances and engaging dialogue, adding up to a romance that makes for a pretty good date movie in its own right." On Metacritic, the film has a weighted average score of 74 out of 100, based on 43 critics, indicating "generally favorable reviews".

Justin Chang of Variety wrote that the film "stands as something unique, even audacious in American independent movies: a fact-based presidential "prequel" that seeks to present two iconic world figures as convincing and relatable romantic leads. And on that particular score, Tanne's movie — toplined by the very well-cast Tika Sumpter and Parker Sawyers — is pretty much an unqualified success."

Critic Peter Travers of Rolling Stone called it "the date movie of the year," and described it as "gorgeously romantic." Richard Brody of The New Yorker touted Tanne's first film as "an opening act of superb audacity," and described it as "a fully realized, intricately imagined, warmhearted, sharp-witted, and perceptive drama, one that sticks close to its protagonists while resonating quietly but grandly with the sweep of a historical epic."

Odie Henderson of RogerEbert.com gave the film four-out-of-four stars, stating that it is "at once a love song to the city of Chicago and its denizens, an unmistakably Black romance and a gentle, universal comedy," adding that "it is unapologetic about all three of these elements, and interweaves them in such a subtle fashion that they become more pronounced only upon later reflection."

Stephanie Zacharek of Time described it as a "vivid and imaginative portrayal," and noted of the two lead performances that "Sawyers captures both the easy, loping rhythms of our future 44th President’s speech and the long-stride elegance of his carriage. Sumpter is equally terrific," adding that "she manifests perfectly the future First Lady's under-the-radar determination, always tempered by empathy."

The film was criticized by several critics for what they deemed a hagiographic depiction of Obama, while others questioned its authenticity. Fred Topel of Guff.com opined that Obama comes across as predatory in the film by ignoring Robinson's boundaries, which he did not find believable.

The film was cited on many year-end lists including The New Yorker, The Washington Post, The San Francisco Chronicle, The Hollywood Reporter, RogerEbert.com, The Huffington Post, Mandatory, Applaudience on Medium and Ain’t It Cool News.

Accolades

Legacy 
Rotten Tomatoes ranked the film #55 on its list of Top 105 Romance Movies of all time. It also ranked the film #53 on its list of The 123 Best Black Movies of the 21st Century and #14 on its list of 55 Movies That Celebrate Black Joy. Entertainment website Collider included the film on its list of The 25 Best Romance Movies of the 21st Century. AARP named it one of the top 12 best movies ever made about U.S. Presidents. Harper's Bazaar cited it as the 41st most Romantic Movie of All Time.

See also
List of black films of the 2010s

References

External links 
 
 
 
 

2016 films
2016 independent films
Films shot in Chicago
Films set in Chicago
Films set in 1989
Films about Barack Obama
Michelle Obama
African-American biographical dramas
American romantic drama films
2016 romantic drama films
IM Global films
Romance films based on actual events
Drama films based on actual events
Films produced by Robert Teitel
Films produced by John Legend
Films scored by Stephen James Taylor
2016 directorial debut films
Films about presidents of the United States
2010s English-language films
2010s American films